Most presidents of the United States received a college education, even most of the earliest. Of the first seven presidents, five were college graduates. College degrees have set the presidents apart from the general population, and presidents have held degrees even though it was quite rare and unnecessary for practicing most occupations, including law. Of the 45 individuals to have been the president, 25 of them graduated from a private undergraduate college, nine graduated from a public undergraduate college, and 12 held no degree.  Every president since 1953 has had a bachelor's degree, reflecting the increasing importance of higher education in the United States.

List by university attended

Did not graduate from college 

George Washington (Although the death of Washington's father ended his formal schooling, he received a surveyor's certificate from the College of William & Mary. Washington believed strongly in formal education, and his will left money and/or stocks to support three educational institutions.)
James Monroe (attended the College of William and Mary, but dropped out to fight in the Revolutionary War)
Andrew Jackson
Martin Van Buren
William Henry Harrison (attended Hampden Sydney College for three years but did not graduate and then attended University of Pennsylvania School of Medicine but never received a degree)
Zachary Taylor
Millard Fillmore (founded the University at Buffalo)
Abraham Lincoln (had only about a year of formal schooling of any kind)
Andrew Johnson  (no formal schooling of any kind)
Grover Cleveland
William McKinley (attended Allegheny College, but did not graduate; also attended Albany Law School, but also did not graduate)
Harry S. Truman (went to business college and law school, but did not graduate)

Undergraduate 

A.JFK enrolled, but did not attend

Additional undergraduate information
Some presidents attended more than one institution. George Washington never attended college, though The College of William & Mary did issue him a surveyor's certificate. Two presidents have attended a foreign college at the undergraduate level: John Quincy Adams at Leiden University and Bill Clinton at the University of Oxford (John F. Kennedy intended to study at the London School of Economics, but failed to attend as he fell ill before classes began.)

Three presidents have attended the United States Service academies: Ulysses S. Grant and Dwight D. Eisenhower graduated from the United States Military Academy at West Point, while Jimmy Carter graduated from the United States Naval Academy at Annapolis, Maryland. No presidents have graduated from the United States Coast Guard Academy or the much newer U.S. Air Force Academy.  Eisenhower also graduated from the Army Command and General Staff College, Army Industrial College and Army War College. These were not degree granting institutions when Eisenhower attended, but were part of his professional education as a career soldier.

Graduate school
A total of 20 presidents attended some form of graduate school (including professional schools). Among them, eleven presidents received a graduate degree during their lifetimes; two more received graduate degrees posthumously.

Business school

Graduate school

Medical school

Law school 

Several presidents who were lawyers did not attend law school, but became lawyers after independent study under the tutelage of established attorneys. Some had attended college before beginning their legal studies, and several studied law without first having attended college.  Presidents who were lawyers but did not attend law school include: John Adams; Thomas Jefferson; James Madison; James Monroe; John Quincy Adams; Andrew Jackson; Martin Van Buren; John Tyler; James K. Polk; Millard Fillmore; James Buchanan; Abraham Lincoln; James A. Garfield; Grover Cleveland; Benjamin Harrison; and Calvin Coolidge.

Presidents who were admitted to the bar after a combination of law school and independent study include; Franklin Pierce; Chester A. Arthur; William McKinley; and Woodrow Wilson.

List by graduate degree earned

Ph.D. (doctorate)

M.B.A. (Master of Business Administration)

M.A. (Master of Arts)

Note: John Adams and John Quincy Adams, along with George W. Bush are the only presidents to date to attain master's degrees.

J.D. or LL.B. (law degree)

Note: Hayes, Taft, Nixon and Ford were awarded LL.B. degrees.  When most U.S. law schools began to award the J.D. as the professional law degree in the 1960s, previous graduates had the choice of converting their LL.B. degrees to a J.D.  Duke University Law School made the change in 1968, and Yale Law School in 1971. Theodore Roosevelt and Franklin D. Roosevelt, both of whom attended Columbia Law School but withdrew before graduating, were awarded posthumous J.D. degrees in 2008.

List by president

Other academic associations

Faculty member

School rector or president

School trustee or governor

See also
 List of prime ministers of Australia by education
 List of prime ministers of Canada by academic degrees
 List of presidents of the Philippines by education
 List of prime ministers of the United Kingdom by education

References

United States 
Education
United States education-related lists